Rowsch Nuri Shaways (Kurdish: ڕۆژ نووری شاوەیس, Arabic: روز نوري شاويس) (15 – 1947 February 2021) was a Kurdish politician who served as the first Prime Minister of the KDP-controlled part of Kurdistan. After the invasion of Iraq that overthrew the Saddam Hussein regime, he served as one of Iraq's two vice presidents in the interim government established in 2004.  Subsequently, he was a Deputy Prime Minister in the government headed by Ibrahim al-Jaafari and later held the same post under Nouri al-Maliki. He also served as Deputy Prime Minister under Haider Al-Abadi from 8 September 2014 to 9 August 2015.
Previously, he served as speaker of the Iraqi Kurdistan National Assembly in the Kurdish autonomous region and was a member of the Kurdistan Democratic Party.

Family and education
His father, Nuri Siddik Shaways, was one of the first Kurdish cabinet ministers in Iraq after the Iraqi–Kurdish Autonomy Agreement of 1970.  His mother Nahida Sheikhsalam served as the first woman Member of Parliament.

He was the eldest of eight brothers.

Dr. Shaways earned a doctorate in engineering in Germany and returned to Iraq in 1975 to join the Kurdish resistance to Saddam Hussein, where he helped lead the Peshmerga forces in many key battles alongside Masoud Barzani.

References

External links
 CBS News profile
 CFR profile

1947 births
2021 deaths
Vice presidents of Iraq
Kurdistan Democratic Party politicians
Government ministers of Iraq
Prime Ministers of Kurdistan Region
Speakers of the Kurdistan Region Parliament
University of Mosul alumni
Date of birth missing
Place of death missing
People from Sulaymaniyah